Zuzanna Orłowska (died after 1583) was the mistress of Sigismund II Augustus. Their relationship lasted for seven years.

References

 Wdowiszewski Z., Genealogia Jagiellonów i Domu Wazów w Polsce, Wydawnictwo Avalon, Kraków 2005, s. 297, przyp. 907.

Mistresses of Sigismund II Augustus
16th-century Polish women
Year of birth unknown